Basualdo is a Spanish surname with significant usage in Argentina. Notable people with the surname include:

Agustina Barroso Basualdo (born 1993), Argentine footballer
Alberto Vernet Basualdo (born 1982), Argentine rugby union player
Betiana Basualdo (born 1976), Argentine para-swimmer
Carlos Basualdo (born 1964), Argentine curator
Fabián Basualdo (born 1964), Argentine footballer
Germán Basualdo (born 1984), Argentine footballer
José Basualdo (born 1963), Argentine footballer
Lucas Basualdo (born 1988), Argentine footballer
Miguel Ángel Basualdo (born 1979), Argentine footballer
Nahuel Basualdo (born 1991), Argentine footballer
Roberto Basualdo (born 1957), Argentine politician
Rodrigo Basualdo (born 1993), Argentine footballer
Yoselín Basualdo (born 2000), Bolivian footballer

Spanish-language surnames